WSBI may refer to:

 World Savings Banks Institute
 WSBI (AM), a radio station (1210 AM) licensed to Static, Tennessee, United States